Hebdo- (symbol H) is an obsolete decimal metric prefix equal to 107. It is derived from the Greek hebdοmos meaning seventh.

It was based on the meridional definition of the metre which established one ten-millionth of a quadrant, a quarter of an astronomical meridian or the distance from the north pole to the equator, as a metre.

See also
10,000,000
Crore, South Asian term for 107
Metric prefix
Metric units
Numeral prefix

References

Greek words and phrases
Metric prefixes
Decimal prefixes